Megalopyge pixidifera is a moth of the Megalopygidae family. It was described by James Edward Smith and John Abbot in 1797. It was described from the southern United States.

References

Moths described in 1797
Megalopygidae